The dipole model of the Earth's magnetic field is a first order approximation of the rather complex true Earth's magnetic field.  Due to effects of the interplanetary magnetic field (IMF), and the solar wind, the dipole model is particularly inaccurate at high L-shells (e.g., above L=3), but may be a good approximation for lower L-shells.  For more precise work, or for any work at higher L-shells, a more accurate model that incorporates solar effects, such as the Tsyganenko magnetic field model, is recommended.

Formulation
The following equations describe the dipole magnetic field.

First, define  as the mean value of the magnetic field at the magnetic equator on the Earth's surface.   Typically .

Then, the radial and latitudinal fields can be described as

Alternative formulation

It is sometimes more convenient to express the magnetic field in terms of magnetic latitude and distance in Earth radii. The magnetic latitude (MLAT), or geomagnetic latitude,  is measured northwards from the equator (analogous to geographic latitude) and is related to the colatitude  by
.

In this case, the radial and latitudinal components of the magnetic field (the latter still in the  direction, measured from the axis of the north pole) are given by

where  in this case has units of Earth radii.

Invariant latitude
Invariant latitude is a parameter that describes where a particular magnetic field line touches the surface of the Earth. It is given by

or

On the surface of the earth, the invariant latitude is equal to the magnetic latitude.

See also
 Geomagnetic pole
 Dipole
 International Geomagnetic Reference Field (IGRF)
 Magnetosphere
 World Magnetic Model (WMM)
 Dynamo theory

References

External links
 Instant run of Tsyganenko magnetic field model from NASA CCMC
 Nikolai Tsyganenko's website including Tsyganenko model source code

Geomagnetism
Magnetic field of the Earth
Space physics